Dundalk G.N.R. made their debut in the Free State League, the top tier of Irish football, in 1926–27. They had played the previous four seasons in the Leinster Senior League. The team was managed by Joe McCleery, previously of Belfast Celtic F.C., who used his connections to Northern Irish football to ensure a supply of players for the season ahead. Home matches were played at the Dundalk Athletic Grounds (a facility near the town centre shared by several sporting codes), but on weekends when the Athletic Grounds were unavailable, matches would usually move to the Carroll's Recreation Ground.

Season summary
On 15 June 1926 Dundalk G.N.R. were elected to the Free State League to replace Pioneers, as the nascent League looked to spread to the provinces. As it was entering its sixth season, nine clubs had already dropped out of the Free State League, so the challenge facing the new club was great. The cost of travel was one of the biggest issues facing provincial clubs in the League, and the club had sought support from its parent company, the Great Northern Railway (Ireland), with regard to travel expenses, but were refused. Three players were retained from the Leinster Senior League squad - Joey Quinn, Paddy McMahon and Hugh Craig.

The season opened with the 18-match League schedule, and on 21 August 1926 the team travelled to Cork to face fellow works-team Fordsons in the opening match of the season. The 30-strong group of players, officials and supporters who travelled were treated to a tour of the Ford factory before the game. The result was a 2–1 defeat for the new boys in a match the Cork Examiner described as being "one of the best ever seen in Ballinlough", Joey Quinn with Dundalk's first ever Free State League goal. Their first win would come at home to Jacobs on 19 September. They only managed two points away from home, including one in the first ever league match in Glenmalure Park, and finished their first league season in eighth position.

The nine-match League of Ireland Shield schedule commenced after Christmas, again with a visit to Cork to play Fordsons. The team managed two home wins and a draw, finishing seventh. Old Leinster Senior League rivals, Drumcondra, defeated them in a replay in the first round of the Leinster Senior Cup; while a heavy defeat to Bohemians saw them exit the FAI Cup in the first round, with the result that a number of players were released, including Quinn. A total of 47 players lined out for the team during the season, 11 of whom appeared only once, as manager McCleery tapped into his Northern Irish connections in his attempts to build a competitive side. Only two players would be retained for the following season - Gordon McDiarmuid (who had joined early in the Shield campaign) and Fred Norwood.

First-Team Squad (1926–27)
Source:Note: Only players making a minimum of five appearances included

Competitions

League
Source:

League table

Shield
Source:

Shield table

FAI Cup
Source:
First Round

Leinster Senior Cup
Source:
First Round

First Round Replay

References
Bibliography

Citations

Dundalk F.C. seasons
Dundalk